Gildo Kassa (born 6 April, 1995) is an Ethiopian dance music composer, songwriter, and singer. He is known for writing and producing songs for young artists, and is known for his 2019 single "Lageba New", which was included on The songs that made Africa — and the world — dance in 2019, Al Jazeera.

Early life 
Gildo was born in Wolaita Sodo, Ethiopia. He got the name Gildo because of his first word as a baby was Gil - Gil, and this became Gil-do to mean "one who say gil - gil" in the Wolaytta language. He was raised with in Protestant Christian which strictly prohibited music. He was inspired by his older brother Kamuzu Kassa to go into music.

Career 
Gildo has produced several hit songs, one of which being "Lageba New" featuring fellow musician Shakura. Per The New Times of Rwanda, Gildo produced more than 300 singles, including more than 59 of his own songs. As he stated in his interview with EBS TV's The Reggae and Afrobeat Music program, his first works were reggae song by Jalud Awel: "Amta Chaweta" and "Dagos Yale Sitota". Kassa is well known by customizing afrobeat to the Ethiopian traditional music, specifically the Wolaita and Tigrigna styles, naming his style "Ethio-shake". The songs he composed and produced were top hit and nominated in many Ethiopian awards. Among those Sancho Gebre's  songs titled "Atasayugn" and "Tanamo" were a few.

He is among the Afrimma 2020 Nominees under the category of "Best Male East Africa". He is the only nominee from Ethiopia. Aljazeera put his song "Lageba New" among the list of the songs that made Africa – and the world – dance in 2019.

Notes

References 

Living people
1995 births
Ethiopian composers
People from Wolayita Zone
21st-century Ethiopian male singers
Composers from Wolayita Zone